Elarica Johnson (born 21 August 1989) is an actress and model, best known for playing Hailey (aka Autumn Night) in P-Valley. Johnson also starred in A Discovery of Witches, in which she played Juliette Durand. She played Kylie in EastEnders, a waitress at Surbiton station in Harry Potter and the Half-Blood Prince, and Lula Landry in the 2017 series Strike.

Filmography

Film
Harry Potter and the Half-Blood Prince (2009)
Chatroom (2010)
My Brother the Devil (2012)
The Forgotten (2014)
AfterDeath (2015)
How to Talk to Girls at Parties (2016)
Blade Runner 2049 (2017)
Six Days of Sistine (2019)

Television
Fallout (2008)
EastEnders - Kylie (2010)
Top Boy (2011)
Thirteen Steps Down (2012)
 Jo - Season 1 Episode 2 Pigalle (Jasmine) (2013)
 The Delivery Man - Season 1 Episode 4 Celebrity (Comfort Evans) (2015)
 Death in Paradise Season 5 Episode 3 Posing in Murder (Sadie Mernier) (2016)
Strike Season 1 The Cuckoo's Calling (Lula Landry) (2017)
A Discovery of Witches (Juliette Durand) (2018)
P-Valley (2020-2022)

References

External links

1989 births
Living people
Black British actresses
English soap opera actresses
English television actresses
English film actresses